The Best Screenplay Award is an award presented by the Jury to the best screenwriter for their work on a film of the Official Selection of the Cannes Film Festival. It was first awarded in 1949.

Winners

See also
 Silver Bear for Best Screenplay

Notes

A: This year the award received the name Prix du scénario original (Original Screenplay Award). 
B: This year the award received the name Prix du scénario et des dialogues au Festival International du Film (Screenplay and Dialogues Award).
C: This year the award received the name Prix du meilleur scénario original (Best Original Screenplay Award).

External links
 Cannes Film Festival Official Website
 Cannes Film Festival at IMDB .

Cannes Film Festival
 
Cannes, Best Screenplay
Screenwriting awards for film